Frank Michael Howson (born 1952) has had a career in entertainment. He directed Flynn (1996) on the early life of Errol Flynn and Hunting (1991). Howson, with Peter Boyle, helped establish Boulevard Films which produced thirteen films from Boulevard of Broken Dreams (1988) to Flynn; besides producing for Boulevard Films, Howson often wrote scripts and directed.

Early years 
Howson was born in Melbourne and started in show business when he was seven. After leaving school, Christian Brothers College, St. Kilda (1963–1967), Howson's first job was with Melbourne radio station 3UZ as office boy. Eventually promoted to panel operator, he worked on John McMahon's popular weekly show Radio Auditions (see 3UZ). Whenever not enough acts showed up, young Frank was summoned to perform under made up names. During this period Howson was nicknamed 'Magical Frank' when asked to perform on a pilot for a TV talent show by 3UZ's Jimmy Hannan.

Recording artist 
DJ Stan Rofe signed Howson to a recording deal and produced his first single: "Seventeen Ain't Young" (written by Jeff Barry) /  Hide and seek (Richie Adams, Mark Barkan) performed by "Frankie Howson" (1969) who was seventeen during recording, it became a Top 40 hit in Melbourne.

Howson released two other singles This Night (Howson, Kenneth Firth, Miller) and 1983 The Heart Is A Lonely Hunter (John Capek, Howson).

Music publisher 
Howson was manager of the Australian branch of German-based I.C. Records to publish musical works (including his own) distributed by EMI. He co-wrote John Paul Young's 1984 album One Foot in Front. He signed New romantic band Pseudo Echo and co-wrote their songs Autumnal Park and Destination Unknown with Tony Lugton, they later had a 1987 No. 1 hit in Australia with their version of Funky Town. I.C. Records scored 3 national hits in Australia in its first 12 months of operation. Howson and Peter Boyle were Executive Producers for John Paul Young's 1983 hit Soldier of Fortune (John Capek, Marc Jordan) reaching No. 15.

Howson and Allan Zavod wrote Time Can't Keep Us Apart which won the 1987 Asian Popular Song contest performed by Kate Ceberano to an estimated TV audience of 500 million.

Theatre works 
Frank Howson began his career as stage actor, singer and dancer, and appeared in 21 major productions (including the Australian production of Oliver!) before turning 21. In the early 1970s, Howson met fellow actor Barry Ferrier while they were both appearing in the original Australian production of Jesus Christ Superstar, and the two men subsequently collaborated on a number of theatre-related projects.  The first of these was a children's musical entitled The Faraway Land of Magical Frank, which was produced at the Toral Theatre in Melbourne in January 1976. Later that year, Howson and Ferrier released a concept recording of a follow-up children's musical, entitled The Boy who dared to dream, performed by Trevor White, pop singer Mark Holden and actors John Waters and Tommy Dysart.  The first staged production of the show (featuring some of the actors from the concept recording) was mounted in Melbourne in January 1978, with a second production in May 1981.

Frank Howson went on to create two more children's musicals, without Ferrier's involvement: Aladdin and his Wonderful Lamp (music by Robert Gavin, 1981) and Sinbad the Sailor: The Last Adventure (music by Ian McKean, 1982).  Both were initially staged at the Alexander Theatre at Monash University..

Filmmaking 
Boulevard Films was a production company on Errol St, North Melbourne.

Boulevard's notable productions include:
 1988 Boulevard of Broken Dreams (Howson screenwriter, cameo) won two AFI Awards:  John Waters "Best Actor" and Kym Gyngell "Best Supporting"; nominated for five others including "Best Picture". Its soundtrack (with nine Howson co-compositions) was nominated for an ARIA Award for Best Soundtrack Album of the Year.
 1989 'Heaven Tonight' (Howson co-wrote the screenplay as well as songs for this film. It was nominated for an AFI Award. It starred John Waters, Kim Gyngell, Rebecca Gilling, Guy Pearce and Sean Scully.
 1990 Friday on My Mind with Guy Pearce
 1990 What the Moon Saw (Howson screenwriter, cameo) won an AFI Award for Rose Chong "Best Costume Design". It revolves around a child absorbed with the story of Sinbad.
 1991 Hunting starred John Savage, Kerry Armstrong (nominated for AFI Best Actress) and Guy Pearce; Howson wrote and directed.
 1996 Flynn starred Pearce, Steven Berkoff, Claudia Karvan and Savage; Howson directed and co-wrote. Problems occurred while making this film with Boulevard Films collapsing acrimoniously.

Some Boulevard Films listed at Internet Movie Database did not have a general release, e.g. The Final Stage (1995) had its 'World Premiere' ten years later at Melbourne Underground Film Festival 2005.

Howson moved to Hollywood in 1997 after a falling out with his business partner and the collapse of Boulevard Films.

Personal life 
Howson has been married three times:
 Lisa Waters (fl. 1976)
 Lynn Murphy (1983–1999) Their son, Oliver Howson was born in 1991.
 Terri Garber (2001–2002)

Howson has been debilitated, at times, by Spasmodic Dysphonia which affects his voice; it is periodically mitigated by Botox injections into his larynx.

His gravelly voice can be heard in a 2005 radio interview with Paul Harris and Brett Cropley of 3RRR on Film Buffs' Forecast.

John Michael Howson is his cousin.

Subsequent career

Hollywood hiatus 
Howson was on the Crystal Prix Jury for the 1997 Cannes Film Festival. From 1997 to 2005 Howson worked and lived in Hollywood. He served on the board of directors for the Starlight Children's Foundation of California.

Mr. Insincere, (written / performed by Howson) appears in the Disney movie Burn Hollywood Burn (1998), starring Eric Idle (as Alan Smithee) and Ryan O'Neal; with Whoopi Goldberg, Jackie Chan, Sylvester Stallone, and Robert Evans. Howson was asked by Steven Berkoff to direct the TV version of Berkoff's international hit theatre show Shakespeare's Villains (2002).

Recently Howson has completed writing his memoirs on the film industry A Life in the Circus, and wrote songs for Steve Housden's (Little River Band lead guitarist) solo album.

MUFF & more 
Richard Wolstencroft formed MUFF in 2000 and appointed Howson as President of the Jury. Boulevard Films' The Intruder (directed by Wolstencroft) and The Final Stage (directed by Howson) were both presented at the 2005 festival. The following year saw Howson's film Remembering Nigel tie with Penny by John King for MUFF's 2006 Best Short Film award.
He acted and was a script editor in a Wolstencroft film, The Beautiful and Damned.

Howson currently serves as a board member of Open Channel, a non-profit organisation that supports young filmmakers. Recently Howson was invited to direct the premiere production of the short play The Replacement Son for the Short and Sweet festival at Melbourne's Arts Centre in December '07.

Some excerpts from Howson's film Flynn can be seen in the new documentary on the life of Errol Flynn, The Tasmanian Devil.

The new release book The Actors' Handbook by Marnie Hill, published by AT2, contains an interview with him.

Howson in 2012 and 2013 wrote and directed two sell-out seasons of the musical "Genesis To Broadway" at Chapel Off Chapel, Melbourne. Cast member Fem Belling was nominated for a Green Room Award for Best Performance in a Musical.

Select filmography 
Backstage (1987)
Boulevard of Broken Dreams (1988)
What the Moon Saw (1989)
Heaven Tonight (1990)
Hunting (1991)
Flynn (1991)
Remembering Nigel (2006) – short

References

External links 

Personal website
Frank Howson at AustLit

1952 births
Living people
Australian film producers
Australian screenwriters
Australian songwriters
Australian theatre directors
Film directors from Melbourne
Theatre directors from Melbourne
People educated at St Mary's College, Melbourne